This is a list of notable people in the past and present associated with Stamford, Connecticut.

Art

 Gutzon Borglum (1867–1941), sculptor of Mount Rushmore, lived in North Stamford 1910–1920
 Paul Calle (1928–2010), artist who created the 1969 stamp commemorating the first manned moon landing
 John Adams Ten Eyck III (1893–1932), painter and etcher
 Helen Frankenthaler (1928–2011), artist, had a home in the Shippan section of town
 Joe Harris (1928–2017), commercial illustrator and storyboard artist, creator of Underdog and the Trix Rabbit
 Hildreth Meière (1892–1961), artist and designer, lived in North Stamford
 Alex Raymond (1909–1956), creator of the Flash Gordon comic strip, lived in North Stamford
 Kevin Salatino, art curator and former director of Huntington Library and Bowdoin College Museum of Art
 Alexander Rummler (1867–1959), painter, lived in the city

Business

 Ralph Bahna (1942–2014), CEO of Cunard Line, chairman of Priceline.com, founder of Club Quarters
 Jeph Loeb (born 1958), comic book writer,  film and television writer, producer, former head of Marvel Television

 Vince McMahon (born 1945) and Linda McMahon (born 1948), founders of World Wrestling Entertainment
 Alexander S. Wolcott (1804–1844), started the first photography commercial portrait studio in the world (New York City)

Entertainers

 Christopher Abbott (born 1986), American actor
 Elizabeth Crocker Bowers (1830–1895), stage actress and theatrical manager, also known professionally as Mrs. D. P. Bowers
 Michael Dante (born 1931), actor and professional baseball player, born in the city
 Dana Delany (born 1956), actress, grew up in Stamford
 Kenny Delmar (1910–1986), actor, died in the city
 Kim Greist (born 1958), actress, was born in the city
 Eileen Heckart (1919–2001), Oscar-winning actress and city resident
 John Henson (born 1967), comedian, was born in the city
 Earl Hindman (1942–2003), actor, died in the city
 Harry Houdini (1874–1926), escape artist, had a summer home in Stamford
 Alan Kalter (1943–2021), announcer on Late Show with David Letterman, lived in the city
 Christopher Lloyd (born 1938), actor, born in Stamford
 Antonio Macia, screenwriter and actor
 Don Morrow (1927–2020), actor, announcer and voiceover artist
 Bill Moseley (born 1951), horror film actor, was born in the city
 Chris Noth (born 1954), actor
 Louise Platt (1915–2003), theatre and film actress, was born in the city
 Bruce Prichard (born 1963), professional wrestling executive
 Gilda Radner (1946–1989), comedian, actress, wife of Gene Wilder, lived in the city
 Katherine Reback (1950/51–2010), screenwriter (Fools Rush In), was a native of Stamford
 Rosemary Rice (1925–2012), actress (Mama), voice-over artist and children's musician 
 Dan Sileo (born 1963), athlete, radio host, was born in the city
 Henry Simmons (born 1970), actor, was born in the city
 Stephen Sondheim (1930–2021), composer, lived in North Stamford when he was a boy
 Grant Tinker (1926–2016), former husband of Mary Tyler Moore and former chairman and CEO of NBC (1981–1986), was born in the city
 Mark Tinker (born 1951), producer, director, and writer, was born in the city
 Vivian Vance (1909–1979), actress who starred as Ethel Mertz in I Love Lucy
 Fredi Washington (1903–1994), actress, died in the city
 Marc Weiner (born 1955), Jewish comedian, clown, puppeteer, and television producer, lives in the city
 Gene Wilder (1933–2016), actor and director, lived and died in the city
 Peggy Wood (1892–1978), actress and a member of the Algonquin Round Table, died in the city

Government and politics

 Andrew P. Bakaj (born 1982), former Department of Defense and CIA Official; lead counsel for the Whisteblower during the Impeachment Inquiry and the subsequent Impeachment of President Donald Trump, born and raised in Stamford
 J. Cofer Black (born 1950), former United States Department of State Coordinator for Counterterrorism with the rank of Ambassador at Large (2002–2004); born in Stamford
 Georges Clemenceau (1841–1929), French Premier during World War I; one of the major voices behind the Treaty of Versailles; taught in a girls' school in Stamford; married one of his pupils, Mary Plummer, in 1869
 Homer Stille Cummings (1870–1956), United States Attorney General, 1933–1939; in 1900, 1901, and 1904, he was elected mayor of Stamford; helped found the Cummings & Lockwood law firm in 1909
 Charles A. Duelfer, chief U.S. weapons inspector in Iraq; raised in Stamford
 Joe Lieberman (born 1942), U.S. Senator and 2000 Democratic nominee for vice president; born in Stamford
 Dan Malloy (born 1955), Governor of Connecticut
 John J. McCloy (1895–1989), prominent adviser to President Franklin D. Roosevelt and President Ronald Reagan; died in Stamford
 William T. Minor (1815–1889), 39th Governor of Connecticut, Consul-General to Havana, Cuba and judge on the Connecticut Superior Court; born in Stamford
Candace Owens (born 1989), conservative commentator and political activist
Jen Psaki (born 1978), former White House Press Secretary 
 Chris Shays (born 1945), Fourth District U.S. representative; former resident of Stamford

Literature, writing, journalism

 Christopher Buckley (born 1952), novelist, editor, William F. Buckley's son, partly grew up in the Cove section
 William F. Buckley, Jr. (1925–2008), founder of National Review magazine, longtime resident in the Cove section
 Albert K. Dawson (1885–1967), photojournalist and film correspondent in World War I. His firm "Brown & Dawson" was based in Stamford between 1912–1919
Greg Farshtey (born 1965), author, editor at Lego, known for his work on Bionicle, grew up in Stamford
Estelle Feinstein (1923–2002), University of Connecticut professor, local historian, lived 45 years in Stamford
 Chris Hansen (born 1959), television journalist, lives in the city
 Harry Harrison (born Henry Maxwell Dempsey, 1925–2012), science-fiction author, was born in the city
 John Hawkes (1925–1998), novelist, was born in the city
 Carol Iovanna (born 1952), newscaster on Fox News, is a resident of the city
 Jeph Loeb, comic book, screen, and television writer, and television and motion picture producer, grew up in Stamford
 J. D. Salinger (1919–2010), author of The Catcher In The Rye, lived in north Stamford briefly in the late 1940s
 Chuck Scarborough (born 1943), television news anchor, lives in North Stamford
 Anthony Julian Tamburri (born 1949), professor, scholar, publisher (Bordighera Press); writes on literature and cinema
 Dana Tyler (born 1958), news anchor for WCBS-TV in New York City, lives in Stamford
 Mort Walker (1923–2018), comic artist, lived in Stamford

Music

 Dave Abbruzzese (born 1968), Pearl Jam's drummer, 1991–1994, was born in the city
 Michael Bolton (born 1953), singer, lived in North Stamford
 Henry "Harry" Thacker Burleigh (1866–1949), singer who made "Swing Low, Sweet Chariot," a nineteenth-century spiritual, popular (in a 1917 compilation); died in the city
 Willy DeVille (1950–2009), R&B singer and composer, was born in Stamford in 1950
 Dorothy Fields (1905–1974), lyricist, rented Buttonwood Manor in North Stamford from William E. Stevens during World War II
 Benny Goodman (1909–1986), the 'King of Swing', lived the last 20 years of his life in Stamford; buried in Long Ridge Cemetery
 Jimmy Ienner (born 1945), music producer
 Jim Koplik, concert promoter, city resident since 1981
 Cyndi Lauper (born 1953), singer, has a home in North Stamford
 Meat Loaf (Michael Lee Aday) (born 1947), rock singer and songwriter, lived in Stamford 1979–1981, coached Babe Ruth League and Little League baseball
 Moby (born 1965), recording artist, previously lived in the South End
 Ezio Pinza (1892–1957), a star of the Metropolitan Opera, lived in North Stamford
 Rakim (born 1968), rapper, lives in the city
 Chris Risola (born 1958), musician and songwriter, lead guitarist of Steelheart, was born in the city
 Sasha Sokol (born 1970), Mexican singer, has a home in the city
 Andrew Sterling (1874–1955), lyricist, died in the city
 Rida Johnson Young (1869–1926), lyricist, died in the city

Religion

 Job Bishop (1760–1831), Shaker leader and community founder, born and raised in Stamford
 James Davenport (1716–1757), clergyman and itinerant preacher noted for often controversial actions during the First Great Awakening, born in Stamford
 Frederick Dibblee (1753–1826), Canadian Church of England clergyman
 Lubomyr Husar (1933–2017), major Archbishop of the Ukrainian Greek Major-Archdiocese of Lviv, was educated at St. Basil's College in Stamford
 Cardinal Ignatius Pin-Mei Kung (1901–2000), Roman Catholic Bishop of Shanghai, China from 1950 until his death, lived his final years in Stamford
Robert Lombardo (1957-), Auxiliary Bishop of Chicago
 Thaddeus F. Malanowski (1922–2020), Deputy Chief of Chaplains of the U.S. Army
 Harriet Bradford Tiffany Stewart (1798–1830), missionary

Sports

 Semyon Belits-Geiman (born 1945), Olympic medal-winning swimmer
Keith Bennett (born 1961), American-Israeli basketball player
 Andy Bloom (born 1973), Olympic shot putter
 Matt Brennan (1897–1963), NFL player
 Garry Cobb (born 1957), NFL football player
 David Cone (born 1963), former MLB pitcher
 Michael Dante (born 1931), former professional baseball player and later a television and film actor, was born in the city
 Chris Dudley (born 1965), former NBA basketball player for teams including the Cleveland Cavaliers and New York Knicks; born in Stamford
 Fred Dugan (1933–2018), NFL player with SF 49ers, Dallas Cowboys and Washington Redskins
 Gigi Fernández (born 1964), member of the International Tennis Hall of Fame
 Jane Geddes (born 1960), winner of 11 LPGA Tour events
 Ryan Haggerty (born 1993), NHL hockey player on the Pittsburgh Penguins
 J. Walter Kennedy (1912–1977), NBA commissioner (1963–1975) and former athletic director at St. Basil's Preparatory School in Stamford; born in Stamford
Parker Kligerman (born 1990), NASCAR driver, born in Stamford
 Dick Mayer (1924–1989), professional golfer, born in Stamford
 Dave Puzzuoli (born 1961), NFL football player
 Jackie Robinson (1919–1972), baseball star, made North Stamford his home later in his life; one of the Stamford little leagues is named after him
 Andy Robustelli (1925–2011), member of the Pro Football Hall of Fame; born and raised in Stamford
 Alex Rodriguez (born 1975), MLB player, is said to have a home in Stamford
 Boris Said (born 1962), NASCAR driver, raised in Stamford
 Dan Sileo (born 1963), former NFL player and currently a radio personality in Los Angeles on The Mighty 1090, born and raised in Stamford
 William E. Stevenson (1900–1985), 1924 Olympic gold medal winner in track; president of Oberlin College; bought Buttonwood Manor in North Stamford in 1937
 Gene Tunney (1897–1978), boxing champion; interred in Long Ridge Union Cemetery in Stamford
 Bobby Valentine (born 1950), former baseball player and former manager of the Boston Red Sox, owner of downtown sports bar "Bobby V's", a downtown sports bar, the city's Director of Public Health and Safety, born in Stamford
 Herb Williams (born 1958), former NBA player and current New York Knicks assistant coach, has a home in Stamford

Other

 Sandra Diaz-Twine (born 1974), two-time winner of Survivor (Pearl Islands and Heroes vs. Villains)
 Dennis Gabor (1900–1979), worked at the CBS Research Lab in Stamford and won a Nobel Prize in Physics
 Ina Garten (born 1948), cooking author, grew up in the city
Esther A. Hopkins (1926–2021), chemist, environmental attorney and Framingham's first African-American selectwoman, born in Stamford
 Robert Jaffe (born 1946), physicist, grew up in Stamford
 Robert Jarvik (born 1946), inventor of the first artificial heart, was reared in Stamford
 Harold June (1895–1962), U.S. Navy test pilot and Antarctic aviator
 F. N. Monjo (1875–1929), Arctic fur trader
 Charles Henry Phillips (1820–1882), inventor of milk of magnesia, lived in and had a factory making the product in town
 Martha Pollack (born 1958), president of Cornell University
 Thomas H. Ruger (1833–1907), Union general in the Civil War and superintendent of West Point, died in the city
 Will Shortz (born 1952), puzzle editor of The New York Times, current resident and organizer of the annual World Puzzle Championship which was held in Stamford in 2000
 Mort Walker (1923–2018), cartoonist for Beetle Bailey and Hi and Lois

See also

 List of people from Connecticut
 List of people from Bridgeport, Connecticut
 List of people from Brookfield, Connecticut
 List of people from Darien, Connecticut
 List of people from Greenwich, Connecticut
 List of people from Hartford, Connecticut
 List of people from New Canaan, Connecticut
 List of people from New Haven, Connecticut
 List of people from Norwalk, Connecticut
 List of people from Redding, Connecticut
 List of people from Ridgefield, Connecticut
 List of people from Westport, Connecticut

References

External links 

  

Stamford Connecticut
Stamford Connecticut